Qarakand (also Romanized as Qarākand; also known as Gharakand Sardrood, Qarah Kand, and Qareh Kand) is a village in Boghrati Rural District, Sardrud District, Razan County, Hamadan Province, Iran. At the 2006 census, its population was 962, in 171 families.

References 

Populated places in Razan County